Kim Jung-hyuk is a Korean author and cartoonist who is regarded as one of the writers who will help usher in the future of Korean literature.

Life
Born in Kimcheon, North Gyeongsang Province in 1971 Kim possesses a diverse resume, including writing professional book reviews for an online bookstore, handling DVDs for a bookstore that specializes in art, writing music columns for a pop culture magazine, and writing for a restaurant industry magazine. In addition to literature, he is interested in a wide range of fields, including movies, music, and food—those around him refer to him as an “everything-ist” rather than a “novelist.” Given his interest in drawing and cartoons, he drew his own illustrations for his story collections and works freelance as a cartoonist. It is perhaps for that reason that he referred to himself in the author’s note of Penguin News as a collection of countless Lego bricks.

Work
Characters with unusual personalities or rare jobs also appear in his stories: a “conceptual inventor” who confines himself underground and invents useless concepts; a man who wanders in search of “Banana, Inc.” with a rough map left behind by a friend who committed suicide; a map surveyor who searches for his direction in life, using a wooden Eskimo map. 
While writing about trivial objects, unusual people, and unseen music, Kim Junghyuk has established himself as a writer who awakens readers to the warmth and importance of analog sensibilities in a digital age.

Kim's stories are considered on the outer fringe of Korean literature, and feature a nearly maniacal focus on the objects of his work. This focus on objects instead of characters is extremely unusual in Korean fiction. Kim Jung-hyuk always attempts to discover new approaches that no one else has delved into.

Works in Translation
 The Glass Shield
 楽器たちの 図書館  (Japanese)
 J'etais un maquereau  (French)
 La Bibliothèque des instruments de musique  (French)

Works in Korean (Partial)
Short Story Collections
 Penguin News (2000)
 Library of Instruments (2008)

Awards
2008, his short story, “Offbeat D,” won the 2nd Kim Yujeong Literary Award.
 2010 Munhak Dongne Young Artist Award
 2011 Today's Young Artist Award
 2012 Yi Hyo-seok Literature Award

References 

1971 births
South Korean writers
Living people
South Korean cartoonists